The 1917 Michigan State Normal Normalites football team represented Michigan State Normal College (later renamed Eastern Michigan University) during the 1917 college football season.  In their first season under head coach Elton Rynearson, the Normalites compiled a record of 3–4 and outscored their opponents by a combined total of 111 to 80. Andrus P. Wilson was the team captain.

In the summer of 1917, previous head coach Elmer Mitchell resigned to accept a coaching position with the University of Michigan. Elton Rynearson was hired as his replacement in July 1917.  Rynearson was 24 years old at the time and had been coaching previously at the Polish seminary in Orchard Lake, Michigan. Rynearson served 26 years as the school's head football coach, compiling a record of 114–58–15 (.648), and his teams outscored their opponents, 2,574 to 1,415.

Schedule

References

Michigan State Normal
Eastern Michigan Eagles football seasons
Michigan State Normal Normalites football